Dominique Wel (born 16 June 1997) is a New Caledonian international footballer who plays as a defender for New Caledonia Super Ligue side AS Métropole.

Career statistics

International

References

1997 births
Living people
New Caledonian footballers
New Caledonia international footballers
Association football defenders